Edwin Maria Katzenellenbogen, also spelled Katzen-Ellenbogen (22 May 1882 – after 1955) was an American eugenicist and physician in the concentration camp of Buchenwald. Born in 1882 in Galicia, he attended a Polish Jesuit high school, and was a practicing Catholic. In 1905 he graduated as a doctor from Leipzig University. He emigrated to the United States that year, where he was naturalized. Katzenellenbogen worked as a eugenicist for the Carnegie Institution. At one point, he was a faculty member at Harvard Medical School. Katzenellenbogen married Aurelia Pierce, the daughter of a Massachusetts Supreme Court Justice, whom he later divorced. 

Katzenellenbogen returned to Germany in the 1930s. In 1943, he was arrested by the Gestapo and sent to Buchenwald concentration camp. There, Katzenellenbogen collaborated with the Nazis as a doctor. He became known for his cruelty especially towards French communists.

In September 1945, Katzenellenbogen was arrested in Marburg. In the Buchenwald Camp Trial (part of the Dachau Trials), he was charged along with 30 others. Katzenellenbogen was accused of mistreating prisoners, and killing 1000 of them via lethal injection. He was one of the few physicians to show remorse at his trial. After being found guilty, Katzenelenbogen requested a death sentence, saying "You have placed the mark of Cain on my forehead. Any physician who committed the crimes I am charged with deserves to be killed. Therefore, I ask for only one grace. Apply to me the highest therapy that is in your hands."

On August 14, 1947, Katzenellenbogen was sentenced to life in prison. He did not receive the death sentence he requested since military prosecutors failed to prove that he committed murder. Katzenellenbogen was instead only found guilty of committing non-fatal abuse.

Katzenellenbogen's sentence was later commuted to 12 years. He was released from prison on September 26, 1953. He returned to the U.S. and resumed practice as a psychiatrist and psychoanalyst until at least the end of 1955. He died some time after that.

References

External links

1882 births
Date of death unknown
20th-century deaths
American people convicted of war crimes
American collaborators with Nazi Germany
German psychiatrists
German emigrants to the United States
American people of Polish-Jewish descent
Harvard University faculty
People convicted in the Dachau trials
Prisoners sentenced to life imprisonment by the United States military